William "Wild Bill" Langer (September 30, 1886November 8, 1959) was a prominent American lawyer and politician from North Dakota, where he was an infamous character, bouncing back from a scandal that forced him out of the governor's office and into multiple trials. He was the 17th and 21st governor of North Dakota from 1932 to 1934 and from 1937 to 1939.

Langer was elected to the United States Senate in 1940, remaining until he died in office in 1959. There he strongly opposed any American military involvement in world affairs, and his opponents derided him as an isolationist.

Early life, education and early career
Langer was born on September 30, 1886 near Casselton, Dakota Territory, to German-Americans Frank and Mary (Weber) Langer. His Catholic father, Frank Langer, was a member of the first legislature of the state of North Dakota. William, who spoke German fluently, was valedictorian of Casselton High School upon graduation in 1904. He obtained a bachelor of laws from the University of North Dakota in Grand Forks, but was too young upon graduation to practice law. He therefore continued his undergraduate education at Columbia, where he graduated at the top of his class in 1910. Although he was offered a position at a prominent New York law firm, he elected to return to North Dakota, where he practiced law in the town of Mandan before starting his career in politics.

Personal life
Langer married Lydia Cady, the daughter of New York architect J. Cleaveland Cady, in 1918, and had four daughters, Emma, Lydia, Mary, and Cornelia (who became a wife of abstract painter Kenneth Noland).

Career
In 1914, Langer was appointed state's attorney of Morton County and was one of a few non-farmers on the Nonpartisan League (NPL) Republican 1916 state ticket. He was elected state attorney general as  the newly formed NPL party swept to victory in the 1916 election, but soon clashed with the party's founder and mercurial leader Arthur C. Townley. By 1920, Langer was publicly accusing Townley of Bolshevism, and failed in a primary campaign to replace the incumbent NPL governor Lynn Frazier as the party's gubernatorial candidate. Langer's break with the NPL leadership was a reflection of the infighting that limited the party's eventual influence on North Dakota politics.

Governor
Langer eventually mended his rift with the NPL and was elected governor of North Dakota in 1932. As governor, Langer in 1933 required all state employees to donate part of their annual salaries to the NPL and to the Leader, a weekly newspaper owned by high-ranking officials in his administration. Collecting this money was not prohibited by state law and was a common, traditional practice. But when donations were made by highway department employees, who were paid through federal relief programs, the U.S. Attorney for North Dakota, P. W. Lanier, charged that the donations constituted a conspiracy to defraud the federal government. Brought to trial in 1934, Langer and five co-conspirators were convicted. The trial was presided over by Judge Andrew Miller and prosecuted by Lanier, two of Langer's strongest political opponents in the state.

The first trial was littered with procedural errors that made it invalid on appeal, including improper and rigged jury selection (the jurors were alleged to have had personal bias against Langer and been hand-picked by Lanier) and heavily biased jury instructions.

Because of the felony conviction, the North Dakota Supreme Court ordered Langer removed from office, and on July 17, 1934, the Court declared Lieutenant Governor Ole H. Olson the legitimate governor. Langer gathered with about ten friends, declared martial law in Bismarck, and barricaded himself in the governor's mansion until the Supreme Court would meet with him. He eventually relented, and Olson served the remainder of Langer's term as governor.

In 1935 the convictions were overturned on appeal. The case against Langer was retried twice in 1935. Miller, following a recusal motion by Langer, refused to step down as judge in the first retrial, which resulted in a hung jury. Between the second and third trials, Lanier filed charges against Langer for committing perjury in his recusal motion against Miller. This trial, unprecedented in its nature on perjury in an affidavit requesting a recusal, resulted in a directed verdict to acquit Langer. The second retrial of the original charges, presided over by a judge other than Miller, resulted in Langer's acquittal.

Throughout the trials, Langer maintained that he was innocent and the victim of a political vendetta by Miller and Lanier. He was reelected governor in 1936. Historian Lawrence Larsen has called Langer "a master of political theater".

Langer's wife, Lydia, ran for governor in 1934 but lost to Democratic candidate Thomas H. Moodie.

Senate Career
In 1938 Langer ran for the Senate as an independent, and received 42% of the vote, losing to Republican Gerald Nye.

The 1940 Senate election was another very dramatic one. Langer defeated incumbent Lynn Frazier in the Republican primary, and then faced both the Democratic candidate, Charles Joseph Vogel, and Republican/NPL Congressman William Lemke, who declined to run for reelection to Congress in order to run for the Senate as an independent. Langer won the election with 38% of the vote.

Because of the trials mentioned above, Langer's qualifications were questioned under Article 1, Section 5 of the Constitution, which declares the U.S. Senate the ultimate judge of its members' elections, qualifications, and returns. The Senate seated Langer conditionally and began an investigation into his trials. The Committee on Privileges and Elections found Langer guilty of "moral turpitude" and unqualified to be a U.S. senator. The full Senate reversed the committee and voted to seat Langer.

Biographer Glenn H. Smith calls Langer's Senate career "A Study in Isolationism, 1940–1959" and emphasizes his close ties with German American and Scandinavian American voters who bitterly remembered the First World War in the Dakotas and deeply distrusted Britain and the United Nations. Like Senator Henrik Shipstead of Minnesota, Langer championed non-interventionism and supported minimizing America's involvement in World War II. At home, he concentrated on making life easier for North Dakotan farmers by raising wheat prices and granting government relief. He was also adamant about implementing affordable healthcare for everyone. As a senator, he served on the Post Office, Civil Service and Indian Affairs committees. He and Shipstead were the only senators to vote against the United Nations Charter in 1945. He was also one of seven senators to oppose full U.S. entry into the United Nations.

After African-American organizations asked Langer to propose a bill for the federal government to pay for the repatriation of African-Americans to the African continent, he did so. The bill, S. 1800, failed to pass.

In September 1950, Langer filibustered to prevent the override of President Harry S. Truman's veto of the McCarran Internal Security Act for five hours before collapsing.

In 1951, Langer lobbied John J. McCloy, the U.S. High Commissioner for Germany, to grant a reprieve to Martin Sandberger, a high-ranking SS official who had been convicted of crimes against humanity and war crimes for his role in the mass murder of Jews and others in Estonia during the Holocaust. Although sentenced to die by the tribunal of the Einsatzgruppen trial, in no small part due to Langer's lobbying, Sandberger's sentence was commuted and he served only 13 years in custody. He died in 2010, at the age of 98.

After the Nonpartisan League merged with the state Democratic party, Langer remained on the Republican ticket in the 1958 Senate elections and won without making a single campaign appearance in the state. He voted for the Civil Rights Act of 1957. Langer died in Washington, D.C. on November 8, 1959. He was the last U.S. senator to lie in state in the Senate Chamber until Robert Byrd of West Virginia in 2010.

Political offices
 1914–1916: State's Attorney for Morton County
 1916–1920: Attorney General of North Dakota
 1933–1934: Governor of North Dakota (removed from office)
 1937–1939: Governor of North Dakota
 1941–1959: United States Senate

Works
 The Famine in Germany. Washington, DC: US Government Printing Office, 1946.

See also

 1952 United States Senate election in North Dakota
 1958 United States Senate election in North Dakota
 List of United States senators expelled or censured
 List of United States Congress members who died in office (1950–99)

Footnotes

Further reading
 Holzworth, John M. The Fighting Governor: The Story of William Langer and the State of North Dakota. Chicago: The Pointer Press, 1938.
 Smith, Glenn H. Langer of North Dakota: A Study in Isolationism, 1940–1959. New York: Garland Publishers, 1979.
 Smith, Glenn H. "William Langer," in Thomas W. Howard, ed. The North Dakota Political Tradition. Ames, IA: Iowa State University Press, 1981.
 Tweton, D. Jerome. "The Politics of Chaos: North Dakota in the 1930s," Journal of the West, Fall 2002, vol. 41, no. 4, pp. 30–35.

External links
 William Langer Papers at the University of North Dakota
 North Dakota Governors – William Langer
 Entry on the secession of North Dakota
 Várdy, Steven Béla and Tooly, T. Hunt: Ethnic Cleansing in Twentieth-Century Europe Available as MS Word for Windows file (3.4 MB) (the result of the conference on Ethnic Cleansing in Twentieth Century Europe held at Duquesne University in November 2000.) Sub-section by CHARLES M. BARBER,  ''The Isolationist as Interventionist: Senator William Langer on the Subject of Ethnic Cleansing, March 29, 1946 pp. 244–262
 William Langer mentioned in Episode 7 of Rachel Maddow's Ultra podcast (2022)

|-

|-

|-

|-

|-

|-

|-

1886 births
1959 deaths
20th-century American politicians
20th-century Roman Catholics
American anti-communists
American people of German descent
American prosecutors
Burials in North Dakota
Catholics from North Dakota
Columbia College (New York) alumni
Governors of North Dakota
Non-interventionism
Nonpartisan League state governors of the United States
Nonpartisan League United States senators
North Dakota Attorneys General
North Dakota Independents
North Dakota politicians convicted of crimes
North Dakota Republicans
People acquitted of corruption
People from Cass County, North Dakota
People from Mandan, North Dakota
Republican Party governors of North Dakota
Republican Party United States senators from North Dakota
University of North Dakota alumni